"(You Make Me Feel Like) A Natural Woman" is a 1967 single released by American soul singer Aretha Franklin on the Atlantic label. The words were written by Gerry Goffin from an idea by Atlantic producer Jerry Wexler, and the music was composed by Carole King. Written for Franklin, the record was a big hit reaching number 8 on the Billboard Hot 100, and became one of her signature songs. It made history in the UK singles chart a week after her death, finally becoming a hit almost 51 years after it was first released entering at #79. Franklin also included a live recording on the album Aretha in Paris in 1968. 

Carole King herself recorded the song for her 1971 album Tapestry.  Among the numerous cover versions of the song include versions by Mary J. Blige and Celine Dion, both of which charted in the same year (1995).  At the 2015 Kennedy Center Honors, Aretha Franklin performed the song to honor award-recipient Carole King.

Original recording
Written by the partnership of Gerry Goffin and Carole King, the song was inspired by Atlantic Records co-owner and producer Jerry Wexler. As recounted in his autobiography, Wexler, a student of African-American musical culture, had been mulling over the concept of the "natural man", when he drove by King on the streets of New York. He shouted out to her that he wanted a "natural woman" song for Aretha Franklin's next album. Goffin and King went home and wrote the song that night. In thanks, they granted Wexler a co-writing credit.

Cash Box said that "from the vocal standpoint, the side is unmatched; and in the ork and production departments, excellent work add up to a shattering performance" and that the song builds to "new emotional peaks" from a "shattering" beginning.

Personnel
Aretha Franklin – lead vocals
Spooner Oldham – piano
Tommy Cogbill – bass
Gene Chrisman – drums
The Sweet Inspirations, Carolyn Franklin & Erma Franklin – background vocals
strings conducted by Ralph Burns

Charts

Certifications

Later versions

"Natural Woman" was released by Peggy Lipton in 1968 on her self-titled album on Ode Records, and by Freddie Hughes in 1968 as "Natural Man" (Wand Records 1192), and by George Benson on his album Goodies in 1968 (Verve Records V6-8771).

Peggy Lee released a version on her 1969 album A Natural Woman.

It was recorded by Carole King on her landmark 1971 album Tapestry. Celine Dion recorded the song in 1995 for the Tapestry Revisited: A Tribute to Carole King album, and released it as a single. Mary J. Blige also recorded the song that year for New York Undercover.

Rod Stewart covered the song on his album Smiler in 1974.

Bonnie Tyler included a cover of the song on her 1978 album Natural Force.

The Aretha Franklin version appears in the 1983 film The Big Chill and is included on both the Original Motion Picture Soundtrack and More Songs from the Big Chill.

Joyce Sims recorded a version of the song for her 1989 album All About Love.

Tami Roman's 90's R&B group, Female recorded a cover of the song for the 1995 motion picture soundtrack Panther.

Beccy Cole covered the song live on her 2007 album, Live @ Lizotte's.

Carole King and Gloria Estefan performed the song in May 2009 in the She's Got a Friend concerts at the Foxwoods Resort Casino in Connecticut. The audio from one of the performances was included on some editions of Estefan's 2013 album, The Standards.

In 2012, Christine Anu covered the song on her album, Rewind: The Aretha Franklin Songbook.

In 2014, Amber Riley covered the song on the fifth-season episode, "Bash," of Fox's musical comedy-drama television series Glee.

In December 2015, Aretha Franklin performed the song at the 2015 Kennedy Center Honors during the section for honoree Carole King.

The song was featured on the debut album of the group Leading Ladies, performed by musical actress Cassidy Janson, who had played the title role in Beautiful: The Carole King Musical.

Jennifer Hudson performed the song at the 2021 Rock and Roll Hall of Fame Induction Ceremony.

Mary J. Blige version

Charts

Celine Dion version
"(You Make Me Feel Like) A Natural Woman" was released as a promotional single by Celine Dion in November 1995 in North America and the United Kingdom. It was featured on a tribute album to Carole King, called Tapestry Revisited: A Tribute to Carole King issued on October 24, 1995. Later, Dion included this track on most editions of her 1996 album Falling into You. The track was produced by David Foster. Dion's version enjoyed a moderate success on the adult contemporary charts, reaching number 4 in Canada and number 31 in the United States. In 2008, the song was featured on the US version of My Love: Ultimate Essential Collection. When Falling Into You won the Grammy for Album of the year in 1997, the song became the first to appear on two Album of the Year winners - following Tapestry's success in 1971.

On April 14, 1998, Dion, Aretha Franklin, Mariah Carey, Shania Twain, Gloria Estefan and Carole King performed the song during a VH1 Divas concert at the Beacon Theatre, New York. The six vocalists were recruited by the cable music network VH1 to raise money for Save the Music, their education charity. Hyped extensively in the press, the event was a ratings winner for VH1 – so successful, in fact, that the network arranged to have the concert released on disc and tape on October 6, 1998. At that time "(You Make Me Feel Like) A Natural Woman" (performed by all the divas) was released as a radio single in selected countries.

Personnel
Celine Dion – performer, vocals (background)
Lynn Davis – vocals (background)
David Foster – arranger, keyboards, producer
Gerry Goffin – composer
Carole King – composer
Michael Thompson – guitar
Jerry Wexler – composer

Formats and track listings
1995 promotional CD single (Celine Dion)
"(You Make Me Feel Like) A Natural Woman" – 3:43

1998 promotional CD single (Divas)
"(You Make Me Feel Like) A Natural Woman" (Live) – 5:15
"You've Got a Friend" (Live) – 5:29

Charts

Weekly charts

Year-end charts

References

External links
 

1967 singles
1967 songs
1995 singles
Aretha Franklin songs
Atlantic Records singles
Carole King songs
Celine Dion songs
Grammy Hall of Fame Award recipients
Mary J. Blige songs
Peggy Lee songs
Song recordings produced by Jerry Wexler
Songs with lyrics by Gerry Goffin
Songs written by Carole King
Songs written by Jerry Wexler
Soul ballads